Michael Willoughby may refer to:
 Michael Willoughby, 11th Baron Middleton, British peer and soldier
 Michael Willoughby, 12th Baron Middleton, British peer